This is a list of Norwegian football transfers in the summer transfer window 2015 by club. Only clubs of the 2015 Tippeligaen and 2015 Norwegian First Division are included. The registration period opened on 22 July and closed on 18 August.

2015 Tippeligaen

Bodø/Glimt

In:

Out:

Haugesund

In:

Out:

Lillestrøm

In:

Out:

Mjøndalen

In:

Out:

Molde

In:

Out:

Odd

In:

Out:

Rosenborg

In:

Out:

Sandefjord

In:

Out:

Sarpsborg 08

In:

Out:

Stabæk

In:

Out:

Start

In:

Out:

Strømsgodset

In:

 

Out:

Tromsø

In:

Out:

Viking

In:

Out:

Vålerenga

In:

Out:

Aalesund

In:

Out:

1. Divisjon

Brann

In:

Out:

Bryne

In:

Out:

Bærum

In:

Out:

Follo

In:

Out:

Fredrikstad

In:

Out:

Hødd

In:

Out:

Hønefoss

In:

Out:

Jerv

In:

Out:

Kristiansund

In:

Out:

Levanger

In:

Out:

Nest-Sotra

In:

Out:

Ranheim

In:

Out:

Sandnes Ulf

In:

Out:

Sogndal

In:

Out:

Strømmen

In:

Out:

Åsane

In:

Out:

References

Norway
Transfers
2015